Amorette Wild (born 10 August 1989), also known as Amy Wild, is a former Australian netball player. Wild played for both New South Wales Swifts and Queensland Firebirds during the ANZ Championship era. She was a member of the Firebirds team that won the 2015 ANZ Championship. She also represented Australia at under-19, under-21 and Fast5 levels.

Early life and education
Wild attended Westfields Sports High School. Between 2004 and 2006 she attended Western Sydney Academy of Sport.

Playing career

New South Wales
Wild played for teams representing Eastwood/Ryde, Fairfield and Sutherland Shire.
Between 2006 and 2010, Wild represented New South Wales in the Australian National Netball Championships at under-17, under-19 and under-21 levels. She was a member of the under-21 teams that won titles in 2009 and 2010. She captained the team that won the 2010 under-21 title.

Sydney Swifts
In 2007, aged seventeen, Wild was a member of the Sydney Swifts team that won the final Commonwealth Bank Trophy league title.

Australian Netball League
Between 2009 and 2011, Wild played for both NNSW Blues and NNSW Waratahs in the Australian Netball League. She played for Blues during the 2009 season before switching to Waratahs for the 2010 and 2011 seasons. In 2010, she captained the Waratahs team that finished as minor premiers and reached the ANL grand final. In the grand final, Wilde scored 23 goals from 25 attempts with a 92% success rate. However Waratahs lost 54–47 to Victorian Fury. She was subsequently named the 2010 ANL MVP. In 2011, Wild was a member of the Waratahs team that won the ANL title.

New South Wales Swifts
Between 2009 and 2013, Wild played for New South Wales Swifts in the ANZ Championship.
On 28 June 2009, she made her Swifts ANZ Championship debut in a 2009 ANZ Championship Round 13 match against Central Pulse. On 26 May 2013, Wild made her 25th ANZ Championship appearance for Swifts in a 2013 ANZ Championship Round 10 match against Northern Mystics.

Queensland Firebirds
In 2014 and 2015, Wild played for Queensland Firebirds in the ANZ Championship. She was signed by  Firebirds as a replacement for Natalie Medhurst. She was a member of the Firebirds teams that were 2014 grand finalists and 2015 ANZ Championship winners.

Central Coast Heart
In 2018 Wild captained the Central Coast Heart team that won the Netball NSW Premier League title. She was also named the MVP in the grand final and won the Nance Kenny OAM Medal as the league player of the year.

Australia
Between 2011 and 2014 Wild represented Australia in the Fast5 Netball World Series. She had previously represented Australia at under-19 and under-21 levels.

Honours

Australia
Fast5 Netball World Series
Runners Up: 2014
Queensland Firebirds
ANZ Championship
Winners: 2015
Runners Up: 2014
NNSW Waratahs
Australian Netball League
Winners: 2011
Runners Up: 2010
Sydney Swifts
Commonwealth Bank Trophy
Winners: 2007
New South Wales
Australian National Netball Championships
Winner: Under-17 (2006), Under-21 (2009, 2010)
Individual
Australian Netball League MVP
Winner: 2010

References

1989 births
Living people
Australian netball players
Australia international Fast5 players
New South Wales Swifts players
Netball New South Wales Blues players
Netball New South Wales Waratahs players
Queensland Firebirds players
Sydney Swifts players
ANZ Championship players
Australian Netball League players
Netball players from Sydney
People educated at Westfields Sports High School
New South Wales state netball league players